Letnica  (formerly German Lattnitz) is a village in the administrative district of Gmina Świdnica, within Zielona Góra County, Lubusz Voivodeship, in western Poland.

The village has an approximate population of 630.

References

Letnica